Donji Kašić is a village in Croatia, in the municipality/town of Benkovac, Zadar County.

Demographics
According to the 2011 census, the village of Donji Kašić has 63 inhabitants. This represents 8.24% of its pre-war population according to the 1991 census.

The 1991 census recorded that 98.96% of the village population were ethnic Serbs (757/765), 0.26% were Yugoslavs (2/765), 0.26% were ethnic Croats (2/765),  and 0.52% were of other ethnic origin (4/765).

See also
 Operation Maslenica
 Islam Grčki
 Smoković

References

Benkovac
Populated places in Zadar County
Serb communities in Croatia